Mark Tucker (born October 11, 1957 in Laurel, Maryland, United States, is an American musician, songwriter, singer, producer, and co-founder of Tetrapod Spools.

His debut album, Batstew, which is now collectible, was released in two runs, each of 100 copies.  The album was re-released in 1996 as a compact disc, with extra tracks that never made it onto the original LP.  It comprises amongst other things recordings of Tucker's car, a 1964 Cadillac which he had nicknamed "The Bat".

In 1982, Tucker recorded his second album, In The Sack.  The music was largely experimental, with tracks including "Everywhere with Sally (Ride)", a pop song recorded backwards.  In 1991, he legally changed his name to T. Storm Hunter and continued to release music under that name.

Discography

Albums
 Batstew — 1975
 This Hearse
 Prologue: 1964 Cadillac
 64Z037375 Part 1
 Before They Call, I Will Answer
 Sideways Love Forever
 64Z037375 Part 2
 Honey Tree
 The Way It Really Is
 Bataszew
 I'm Nothing
 Submerged Bat Vortex
 All Cars Are Sisters
 1964 Cadillac
 Kids
 Bataszew (Alternate Version 2)
 This Beach Is Very
 Kotzebue
 In The Sack — 1983
 Harem-Scarem Suite — 1996
 EVA: The Bat
 KITCHY: The Lady From Nod
 AGNES: Seldom Siren Of Delusion
 SANDY: Since Night You Loved Me; Yet Since Night You Left Me
 COTTON: Disappearing Candy
 SHELLEY: Once Beneath The Bridge
 SALLY: Holdin' Sally In The Alley
 ELLEN: Someone To Love Me
 DAISY: Laundry Dog
 DAPHNE: The Laurel Tree Of Apollo

References

External links
Reviews of Mark Tucker's 'Batstew', De Stijl website

1957 births
Living people
American rock musicians
American experimental musicians
People from Laurel, Maryland
Record producers from Maryland